Citizen Nikanorova Waits for You is a 1978 Soviet comedy film directed by Leonid Maryagin.

Plot 
The rural queen is already tired of looking for her prince. And suddenly she discovers a new veterinarian in her house.

Cast 
 Natalya Gundareva as Katya Nikanorova
 Borislav Brondukov as Pavel Ivanovich Dyozhkin, veterinarian
 Yevgeny Kindinov as Zhenya, Dyozhkin's friend
 Ivan Ryzhov as Leopold Vasilyevich, collective farm chairman
 Mikhail Vaskov as Slava, collective farm chauffeur
 Gennadiy Frolov as Stepan, Nikanorova's familiar
 Lev Borisov as The Social Power, drinkman
 Natalya Gushchina as Liza, Nikanorova's friend
 Vera Novikova as Tamara, Dyozhkin's assistant
 Valentina Berezutskaya as Aunt Lyuba, Nikanorova's neighbour

References

External links 
 

1978 films
1970s Russian-language films
Soviet comedy films
1978 comedy films